The men's and women's beach volleyball contests at the 2009 Jeux de la Francophonie were held between 28 September and 4 October. The venue for the competition was Byblos beach in northern Beirut. Canada and France were the men's and women's tournament winners respectively. The host, Lebanon, entered two separate teams into both the men's and women's tournament. The competition was a demonstration sport at the 2009 edition of the Games, thus the medals awarded did not count towards the countries' overall totals.

Men's competition

Group stage

Finals

Women's competition

Group stage

Finals

Medal table

References
General
Livre des Résultats. Jeux de la Francophonie (2009). Retrieved on 2009-10-09.
Specific

External links
Official results

Sport in Lebanon
2009 Jeux de la Francophonie
Beach volleyball at the Jeux de la Francophonie
2009 in beach volleyball